The International Organization for Migration (IOM) is a United Nations agency that provides services and advice concerning migration to governments and migrants, including internally displaced persons, refugees, and migrant workers.

The IOM was established in 1951 as the Intergovernmental Committee for European Migration (ICEM) to help resettle people displaced by World War II. It became a United Nations agency in 2016.

The IOM is the principal UN agency working in the field of migration. The IOM promotes humane and orderly migration by providing services and advice to governments and migrants.

The IOM works in the four broad areas of migration management: migration and development, facilitating migration, regulating migration, and addressing forced migration.

History
The IOM was born in 1951 out of the chaos and displacement of Western Europe following the Second World War. It was first known as the Provisional Intergovernmental Committee for the Movement of Migrants from Europe (PICMME). Mandated to help European governments to identify resettlement countries for the estimated 11 million people uprooted by the war, the IOM arranged transport for nearly a million migrants during the 1950s.

The Constitution of the International Organization for Migration was concluded on 19 October 1953 in Venice as the Constitution of the Intergovernmental Committee for European Migration. The Constitution entered into force on 30 November 1954 and the organization was formally established.

The organization underwent a succession of name changes from PICMME to the Intergovernmental Committee for European Migration (ICEM) in 1952, to the Intergovernmental Committee for Migration (ICM) in 1980, and finally, to its current name, the International Organization for Migration (IOM) in 1989; these changes reflect the organization's transition over half a century from an operational agency to a migration agency.

While the IOM's history tracks the man-made and natural disasters of the past half century—Hungary 1956, Czechoslovakia 1968, Chile 1973, the Vietnamese Boat People 1975, Kuwait 1990, Kosovo and Timor 1999, and the Asian tsunami, the 2003 invasion of Iraq, the Pakistan earthquake of 2004/2005, the 2010 Haiti earthquake, and the ongoing European migrant crisis—its credo that humane and orderly migration benefits migrants and society has steadily gained international acceptance.

From its roots as an operational logistics agency, the IOM has broadened its scope to become the leading international agency working with governments and civil societies to advance the understanding of migration issues, encourage social and economic development through migration, and uphold the human dignity and well-being of migrants.

The broader scope of activities has been matched by rapid expansion from a relatively small agency into one with an annual operating budget of $1.8 billion and some 11,500 staff working in over 150 countries worldwide.

As the "UN migration agency", the IOM has become a main point of reference in the heated global debate on the social, economic and political implications of migration in the 21st century.

The IOM became a related organization of the United Nations in September 2016.

The IOM supported the creation of the Global Compact for Migration, the first-ever intergovernmental agreement on international migration which was adopted in Marrakech, Morocco in December 2018. To support the implementation, follow-up and review of the Global Compact on Migration, The UN Secretary General, Antonio Guterres, established the UN Network on Migration. The secretariat of the UN Network on Migration is housed at the IOM and the Director General of the IOM, Antonio Vitorino, serves as the Network Coordinator.

Activities 
The IOM works to help ensure the orderly and humane management of migration, to promote international cooperation on migration issues, to assist in the search for practical solutions to migration problems and to provide humanitarian assistance to migrants in need, be they refugees, displaced persons or other uprooted people.

The IOM Constitution gives explicit recognition to the link between migration and economic, social and cultural development.

The IOM works in the four broad areas of migration management: migration and development, facilitating migration, regulating migration, and addressing forced migration. Cross-cutting activities include the promotion of international migration law, policy debate and guidance, protection of migrants’ rights, migration health and the gender dimension of migration.

In addition, the IOM has often organized elections for refugees out of their home country, as was the case in the 2004 Afghan elections and the 2005 Iraqi elections.

For the 2009 EU-Anti-Trafficking Day, the Geneva Headquarters launched the Buy Responsibly awareness raising campaign to counter human trafficking. A year later, the campaign was introduced in the Netherlands and Austria, among other countries.

IOM X

IOM X is a campaign operated by the International Organization for Migration in Bangkok that encourages safe migration and prevents exploitation and human trafficking in the Asia Pacific region. The campaign addresses issues related to exploitation and human trafficking, such as protecting men enslaved in the Thai fishing industry, the use of technology to identify and combat human trafficking, and end the sexual exploitation of children.

2003 Amnesty and Human Rights Watch 
In 2003, both Amnesty International and Human Rights Watch was critical of the IOM's role in the Australian government's "Pacific Solution" of transferring asylum seekers to offshore detention centres. Human Rights Watch criticized the IOM for operating Manus Regional Processing Centre and the processing center on Nauru despite not having a refugee protection mandate. Human Rights Watch criticized the IOM for being part of "arbitrary detention" and for denying asylum seekers access to legal advice. Human Rights Watch urged the IOM to cease operation the process centres, which it stated were "detention centres" and to hand management of the centres to the United Nations High Commissioner for Refugees. 

Amnesty International expressed concern that the IOM undertook actions on behalf of governments that negatively impacted the human rights of asylum seekers, refugees and migrants. Amnesty International cited an example of fourteen Kurds in Indonesia who were expelled from Australian waters by Australian authorities to relocated to Indonesia. Amnesty International requested an assurance that the IOM will abide by the principle of non-refoulement.

2022 Refugee Council of Australia 

In 2022, the role that the IOM played in housing refugees in Indonesia was described by the Refugee Council of Australia as presenting a "humanitarian veneer while carrying out rights-violating activities on behalf of Western nations” by researchers Asher Hirsch and Cameron Doig in The Globe and Mail.

The community housing that the IOM operated, using Australian government funding was described by the Refugee Council of Australia "inhumane conditions, solitary confinement, lack of basic essentials and medical care, physical and sexual abuse, and severe overcrowding". Rohingya John Joniad described the housing as an "open prison".

Member states

As of 2021, the International Organization for Migration has 174 member states and 8 observer states. Member states:

Observer States:

Non-Member States:

See also
 Bibi Duaij Al-Jaber Al-Sabah, the IOM Goodwill Ambassador for Kuwait.
 United Nations High Commissioner for Refugees (UNHCR), also based (like the IOM) in Geneva.

Bibliography 

 Andrijasevic, Rutvica; Walters, William (2010): The International Organization for Migration and the international government of borders. In Environment and Planning D: Society and Space 28 (6), pp. 977–999.
 Georgi, Fabian; Schatral, Susanne (2017): Towards a Critical Theory of Migration Control. The Case of the International Organization for Migration (IOM). In Martin Geiger, Antoine Pécoud (Eds.): International organisations and the politics of migration: Routledge, pp. 193–221.
 Koch, Anne (2014): The Politics and Discourse of Migrant Return: The Role of UNHCR and IOM in the Governance of Return. In Journal of Ethnic and Migration Studies 40 (6), pp. 905–923. .

References

External links

 

Migration-related organizations
United Nations General Assembly observers
Organisations based in Geneva
United Nations organizations based in Geneva
Intergovernmental organizations established by treaty
Organizations established in 1951
Migration studies
1951 establishments in Switzerland